Homer Township is one of twenty-four townships in Bates County, Missouri, and is part of the Kansas City metropolitan area within the USA.  As of the 2000 census, its population was 449.

Geography
According to the United States Census Bureau, Homer Township covers an area of 34.71 square miles (89.9 square kilometers); of this, 34.42 square miles (89.16 square kilometers, 99.18 percent) is land and 0.28 square miles (0.74 square kilometers, 0.82 percent) is water.

Cities, towns, villages
 Amoret

Unincorporated towns
 Mulberry at 
(This list is based on USGS data and may include former settlements.)

Adjacent townships
 West Point Township (north)
 Elkhart Township (northeast)
 Charlotte Township (east)
 Walnut Township (south)
 Potosi Township, Linn County, Kansas (southwest)
 Valley Township, Linn County, Kansas (west)
 Lincoln Township, Linn County, Kansas (northwest)

Cemeteries
The township contains these two cemeteries: Benjamin and Jackson.

Major highways
  Missouri Route 52

School districts
 Hume R-VIII
 Miami R-I

Political districts
 Missouri's 4th congressional district
 State House District 125
 State Senate District 31

References
 United States Census Bureau 2008 TIGER/Line Shapefiles
 United States Board on Geographic Names (GNIS)
 United States National Atlas

External links
 US-Counties.com
 City-Data.com

Townships in Bates County, Missouri
Townships in Missouri